Pohnpeic, also rendered Ponapeic, is a subgroup of the Chuukic–Pohnpeic branch of Micronesian in the Austronesian language family. The languages are primarily spoken in Pohnpei State of the Federated States of Micronesia.

Languages
Mokilese
Pingelapese
Pohnpeian
Ngatikese

Innovations
Pohnpeic languages are distinct from the closely related Chuukic languages as a result of uniquely developed innovations. One such innovation is nasal substitution, where the first element in a consonant geminate becomes a homorganic nasal consonant.

Phonology

1 In the Pohnpeic languages, geminate obstruents are realized as homorganic nasal-obstruent clusters.
2 Often before .
3 Before .
4 The reflex is *∅ sporadically before PMc *e.

Reconstructed vocabulary

References 

 
Chuukic–Pohnpeic languages